Blinding Edge Pictures is an American film and television production company, founded in 1998 by M. Night Shyamalan. The company is known for producing films, such as the Unbreakable series, Signs, The Village, The Happening, After Earth, The Visit, Old and Knock at the Cabin.

Overview
On August 2, 1998, M. Night Shyamalan founded Blinding Edge Pictures. The first films produced by the company include Unbreakable, Signs, and The Village.

In July 2008, The Night Chronicles was formed as a division for Blinding Edge Pictures and Media Rights Capital. The plan for this division was to create a trilogy of films with Shyamalan writing and producing the stories and picking the filmmakers while Media Rights Capital would finance the films. The first installment in The Night Chronicles trilogy was the 2010 horror film Devil helmed by John Erick Dowdle, the film revolves on five people trapped in an elevator where one of them is the Devil. In June 2010, Reincarnate (formerly Twelve Strangers) was announced to be the second installment in the trilogy which would be helmed by Daniel Stamm, the  film revolves on a jury that's haunted by supernatural forces while deliberating on a murder case. In September 2010, the third installment in the trilogy would be a sequel to Shyamalan's film Unbreakable, the film would've focused on a villain origin story.

In 2015, the company released its first television series Wayward Pines created by Chad Hodge and executive produced by Shyamalan and released by Fox.

In January 2016, it was announced that Shymalan would executive produce a reboot of Tales from the Crypt as part of TNT's new two-hour horror block. The network ordered a 10-episode season that was slated for Fall 2017. The series was to keep the episodic anthology format based on the Tales from the Crypt comics by EC Comics rather than the 1989 series, with the Cryptkeeper not being featured in the reboot. In June 2017, it was announced that TNT would not move forward with the series due to legal rights.

In 2019, the company released its second television series Servant, created by Tony Basgallop and executive produced by Shyamalan and released by Apple TV+.

In February 2023, Shyamalan signed a multi-year first-look directing and producing deal with Warner Bros. Pictures, thus ending his deal with Universal Pictures. The deal would have Shyamalan and his company develop original projects for the filmmaker to produce and/or direct for WBPG production divisions Warner Bros. Pictures and New Line Cinema. The first two films from the deal include The Watchers written and directed by Ishana Night Shyamalan and Trap written and directed by Shyamalan, both slated for a 2024 release.

Filmography

Television series

Documentaries

References

 
1998 establishments in Pennsylvania
American companies established in 1998
Companies based in Chester County, Pennsylvania
Film production companies of the United States
M. Night Shyamalan
Mass media companies established in 1998
Television production companies of the United States